Ingleside on the Bay is a city in San Patricio County, Texas, United States. The population was 615 at the 2010 census.

Geography

Ingleside on the Bay is located at  (27.828753, –97.221723).

According to the United States Census Bureau, the city has a total area of 0.3 square mile (0.8 km2), of which 0.3 square mile (0.8 km2) is land and 3.23% is water.

Demographics

As of the census of 2000, there were 659 people, 260 households, and 199 families residing in the city. The population density was 2,218.6 people per square mile (848.1/km2). There were 304 housing units at an average density of 1,023.4 per square mile (391.3/km2). The racial makeup of the city was 90.74% White, 0.46% African American, 0.46% Native American, 0.61% Asian, 5.61% from other races, and 2.12% from two or more races. Hispanic or Latino of any race were 12.14% of the population.

There were 260 households, out of which 28.1% had children under the age of 18 living with them, 68.8% were married couples living together, 5.4% had a female householder with no husband present, and 23.1% were non-families. 18.1% of all households were made up of individuals, and 6.9% had someone living alone who was 65 years of age or older. The average household size was 2.53 and the average family size was 2.87.

In the city, the population was spread out, with 22.3% under the age of 18, 5.2% from 18 to 24, 26.6% from 25 to 44, 32.8% from 45 to 64, and 13.2% who were 65 years of age or older. The median age was 43 years. For every 100 females, there were 104.7 males. For every 100 females age 18 and over, there were 102.4 males.

The median income for a household in the city was $45,500, and the median income for a family was $50,357. Males had a median income of $37,986 versus $22,411 for females. The per capita income for the city was $18,067. About 9.8% of families and 12.4% of the population were below the poverty line, including 14.5% of those under age 18 and 12.0% of those age 65 or over.

Education
Ingleside on the Bay is served by the Ingleside Independent School District.

References

Cities in Texas
Cities in San Patricio County, Texas
Cities in the Corpus Christi metropolitan area
Populated coastal places in Texas